Treasure Island in Outer Space is a 1987 Italian science fiction television miniseries directed by Antonio Margheriti.

Plot
It is based on the 1883 novel Treasure Island by Robert Louis Stevenson, setting the story in Italy and in space in the year 2300.

Cast

Itaco Nardulli : Gimmi Hawkins
Anthony Quinn : Long John Silver
Ernest Borgnine : Captain Billy 'Bill' Bones
David Warbeck : Dr. Livesey
Philippe Leroy : Count Ravano
Klaus Löwitsch : Cap. Smollett
Andy Luotto : Ben Gunn
Giovanni Lombardo Radice : Hands
Enzo Cerusico : Vougest
Ida Di Benedetto : Mother of Jim
Biagio Pelligra : Pew, the blind man

Production
The series was produced by RAI (Radiotelevisione Italiana) and directed by Antonio Margheriti under the pen name Anthony M. Dawson. It is the biggest sci-fi production of Italian television.

The miniseries of 5 episodes of 100 min was originally aired in Italy from November 19, 1987, on RAI Due channel. It was also adapted as a 120 min film. The miniseries is also known as Space Island (UK and Norway, USA on VHS) and Der Schatz im All (Germany).

See also
List of German television series
Treasure Planet (Disney animated film)

External links
 

Italian television miniseries
Italian science fiction television series
Television series based on Treasure Island
Television series set in the 24th century
1987 Italian television series debuts